Peter von Gunten (born 1941) is a Swiss film director, cinematographer and screenwriter. He directed eleven films between 1971 and 2005. His 1989 film Pestalozzi's Mountain was entered into the 39th Berlin International Film Festival.

Selected filmography
 Pestalozzi's Mountain (1989)

References

External links

1941 births
German-language film directors
Living people
Swiss film directors
Swiss cinematographers
Swiss screenwriters
Male screenwriters
People from Bern